José Carlos Ribeiro de Carvalho Guimarães (born 9 April 1964 in Luanda), known as Zé Carlos, is a former Angolan basketball player and a former coach of the Angola national basketball team. He played as a guard and as a forward. 
He achieved a huge success in his career playing for Portuguese side Benfica, where he won several National Championship and the Cup of Portugal titles, with his fellow countryman Jean-Jacques. Guimarães also lived the dream of playing against the 1992 US Olympic Dream Team and at the 1996 Summer Olympics. He later became assistant coach of the Angola Squad. He served as coach of the Angolan national basketball team from May 2012 to May 2013.

Dismissal as head coach 
On a press conference held on May 31, 2013, Guimarães said he is considering abandoning all basketball-related activity due to the disrespectful manner that some individuals -  whom he did not name - handled the case of his dismissal. Guimarães learned of his dismissal, with the announcement by the Angolan Basketball Federation in a previous news conference, of Paulo Macedo as the new head coach. After they let me do all the preparations, summon the players, prepare training camp, they just decided to sack me, he said. Guimarães has been offered, instead, a job as an advisor to the chairman of the Angolan Basketball Federation, Paulo Madeira, which he declined. The Angolan media, generally agrees that the Federation should have handled Mr. Guimarães' dismissal in a more appropriate way, such as giving him proper notice of his own dismissal.

References

External links
 

1964 births
Living people
Angolan basketball coaches
Angolan expatriate basketball people in Portugal
Angolan men's basketball players
1990 FIBA World Championship players
Basketball players at the 1992 Summer Olympics
Basketball players at the 1996 Summer Olympics
C.D. Primeiro de Agosto men's basketball players
Olympic basketball players of Angola
Point guards
FC Porto basketball players
S.L. Benfica basketball players
Sporting Clube de Luanda basketball players
Basketball players from Luanda
1986 FIBA World Championship players